The 1951 Polish–Soviet territorial exchange or Polish–Soviet border adjustment treaty of 1951 was a border adjustment signed in Moscow between the Soviet-imposed People's Republic of Poland and the Soviet Union regarding roughly  of land, along their mutual border. The agreement was signed on February 15, 1951, ratified by the People's Republic of Poland on May 28, 1951, and the USSR on May 31. It modified the border treaty of August 16, 1945, and entered into force on June 5, 1951. The exchange was made to the decisive economic benefit of the Soviet Union due to rich deposits of coal given up by Poland. Within eight years following the agreement, the Soviets built four large coal mines with a total annual mining capacity of 15 million tons. The Ukrainian Soviet Socialist Republic government had no say in this process.

In exchange, the Soviet Union ceded part of the Ukrainian SSR's Drohobych Oblast (1939–1959): the city of Ustrzyki Dolne and the villages of Czarna (Ukrainian:  Chorna), Shevchenko (whose name was restored to its prewar Polish name of Lutowiska in 1957), Krościenko, Bandrów Narodowy, Bystre and Liskowate. All of this territory became part of the Krosno Voivodeship in 1975, and of the Subcarpathian Voivodeship on 1 January 1999.

Poland gave up part of the Lublin Voivodeship, with the cities of Bełz (Ukrainian:  Belz), Uhnów ( Uhniv), Krystynopol ( Chervonohrad) and Waręż (Varyazh). All of this territory is now part of Chervonohrad Raion, Lviv Oblast, Ukraine.

After World War II, the territory of Poland changed dramatically, moving westwards. Poland gained the former German provinces of Silesia and Pomerania, with the eastern part of Brandenburg and the southern part of East Prussia. The eastern border of the country was established roughly along the Curzon Line, leaving Białystok in Poland and Lviv in the Soviet Ukraine.

The border of Poland and the Soviet Union, delimited on the 1945 agreement remained almost unchanged until the early 1950s (with a minor correction in 1948, when the village of Medyka near Przemyśl was transferred to Poland). Then, rich deposits of coal were confirmed in the so-called Bug River knee – Polish postwar territory between the upper Bug and the Sołokija River. The Soviet government decided to gain control over this land, which possessed not only coal but also fertile black soil.

Negotiations
The government of the People's Republic of Poland formally asked the government of the USSR to exchange a small border section of Poland with an equivalent border section of the territory of the USSR.

During the negotiations held in Moscow in January and February 1951, both delegations tried to increase the value of the territory they would receive as much as possible. Initially, the Soviets proposed to exchange almost all of the Tomaszowski and Hrubieszowski powiats along with the bend of the Bug river, remembering the rich forests and oil in the Bieszczady Mountains. The Polish deputy minister of foreign affairs at the time was the well-known geographer Stanisław Leszczycki, who discreetly advised against such an exchange. Thus, the Poles rejected the original version of the agreement and, although Leszczycki was dismissed from his post at the end of 1950, the deal was to concern only the knee of the Bug in exchange for which Poland would receive a section of the Bieszczady Mountains with one town, Ustrzyki Dolne. Soviet Deputy Minister of Foreign Affairs Anatoly Lavrentiev repeatedly emphasized that the USSR was giving Poland lands of great natural wealth. He also diminished the significance for the USSR/Ukraine of the railway line from Kovel to Lviv.

Responding to the Polish negotiators, the Ukrainian deputy prime minister Leonid Korniyets said that surveying at the border had displayed very poor results, although coal deposits had been identified before the war. Initially, it was proposed that Poland should pay the difference resulting from a higher valuation of the territory surrendered by the USSR. Polish negotiators did not agree to such a solution, and were unwilling to cede Nyzhankovychi, Dobromyl, and Khyriv. To Aleksander Zawadzki's complaint that this would mean that the railway line to Ustrzyki Dolne, which would be in Poland, would run through the territory of the Ukrainian SSR, the Soviet representatives did not react at all.

Agreement concerning the exchange
On 15 February 1951, the governments of the People's Republic of Poland and the Soviet Union signed a bill that ratified the change of the eastern border of Poland. According to the agreement, Poland transferred to the Ukrainian Soviet Socialist Republic  of territory located west of the town of Sokal, which had been located in the Hrubieszów county of the Lublin Voivodeship (together with the towns of Bełz, Krystynopol and Uhnów, as well as the Rawa Ruska - Krystynopol) rail line. These towns are now located in Chervonohrad Raion of the Lviv Oblast..

According to the agreement, all real estate left behind in the exchanged territories, such as infrastructure, buildings, farms, and rail lines, were automatically transferred to the new owner and both sides relinquished all future claims. Moveable goods were allowed to be kept by private individuals under the condition that the owners had to take them when they left. The Polish population of the Sokal area was transferred in May 1951, mainly to the Recovered Territories. The inhabitants of the town of Belz settled in Ustrzyki Dolne.

Officially, the Polish side declared that the exchange took place on Warsaw's initiative. However, in the early 1950s, Poland was de facto controlled by the Soviet Union and all pertinent decisions were made by Joseph Stalin.

Results
As a result of the exchange on the railway route from Zagórz to Przemyśl, PKP trains passed through the territory of the USSR-Ukraine. They were closed and escorted by commuters inside with dogs and border guards standing on the steps of the wagons. The idea of obtaining oil resources in that area was quite doubtful. Polish geologists were well aware that the offer referred to small pond resources similar to those in the vicinity of Krosno, Jasło and Gorlice. They were described quite accurately on geological maps, and production at 85 tons per day did not have a significant impact on the volume of Polish imports of this raw material.

Although the territory ceded to Poland was roughly as large as the territory transferred to the Soviet Union, the land around Ustrzyki Dolne lacked industry, natural resources and fertile soil. On top of that, it was already depopulated during the 1947 Polish-Soviet Operation Vistula. The territory is now part of Bieszczady County (Subcarpathian Voivodeship).

Plans of next exchange 
In November 1952, the Soviet Union wanted to incorporate a larger territory,  in size, and inhabited by more than 100,000 people to accommodate Soviet plans to expand its coal industry. Poland would have lost large parts of Hrubieszów and Tomaszów counties with town Hrubieszów, former towns Tyszowce, Horodło, Kryłów and would receive part of Drohobych Oblast with town Khyriv (Chyrów) and whole railway Przemyśl-Zagórz, separated by Polish-Soviet border in 1945 and previously demanded by Polish delegation, but refused by Soviet officials. The second exchange was abandoned due to Stalin's death on March 5, 1953, and never realized.

See also
 Territorial changes of Poland after World War II
 Polish areas annexed by the Soviet Union
 Curzon Line
 Kresy
 List of national border changes since World War I
 History of the Ukrainian minority in Poland
 Repatriation of Ukrainians from Poland to USSR (1944-1946)
 Operation Vistula
 Polish minority in Ukraine
 Repatriation of Poles (1944–1946)#From Ukraine
 Repatriation of Poles (1955–1959)
 Polish-Ukrainian border

References

  Agreement (with Protocol and annexes) concerning the exchange of sectors of Poland and USSR territories. Signed at Moscow, on 15 February 1951. Text of the document. No. 6222.
  Historia.net.pl. 

Poland–Soviet Union border
Treaties of the Soviet Union
1951 in Ukraine
History of Lviv Oblast
History of Podkarpackie Voivodeship
Treaties concluded in 1951
Treaties entered into force in 1951
Polish-soviet Territorial Exchange, 1951
Polish-soviet Territorial Exchange, 1951
Treaties involving territorial changes
Poland–Ukraine border
Boundary treaties
Polish-soviet Territorial Exchange, 1951
Treaties of the Polish People's Republic